Zehiriyeh (also Romanized as Z̧ehīrīyeh, Z̧ahīrīyeh, and Zahriyeh; also known as Z̧ahīrī) is a village in Shahid Modarres Rural District, in the Central District of Shushtar County, Khuzestan Province, Iran. At the 2006 census, its population was 277, in 62 families.

References 

Populated places in Shushtar County